Haydarlı is a village in the Gölbaşı District, Adıyaman Province, Turkey. The village is populated by Kurds of the Atma tribe and had a population of 434 in 2021.

The hamlets of Cerrahobası, İstasyon, Ortaoba and Sorgun are attached to the village.

References

Villages in Gölbaşı District, Adıyaman Province

Kurdish settlements in Adıyaman Province